Saïd Boussif (born December 16, 1989) is a music executive and management for several French singers such as Maître Gims, Dadju, Vitaa, Amel Bent, Slimane, and Camélia Jordana. In 2016, he was cofounder and CEO of Indifference Prod.

References 

French record producers
1989 births
Living people